Richard Claude "Rick" Vaive (born May 14, 1959) is a Canadian former professional ice hockey player. He played in the final season of the World Hockey Association (WHA), before playing the majority of his career in the National Hockey League (NHL) from 1979 to 1992.

He is the first 50-goal scorer in Toronto Maple Leafs franchise history.

Biography
Vaive was born in Ottawa, Ontario to Claude (d. 2016) and Mary Vaive (d. 2010), but grew up in Charlottetown, Prince Edward Island after he turned 11. Grandparents Lionel and Reina Vaive were from Gatineau, Quebec. As a youth, he played in the 1970 and 1971 Quebec International Pee-Wee Hockey Tournaments with a minor ice hockey team from Amherst, Nova Scotia.

His professional career began in the World Hockey Association (WHA) with the Birmingham Bulls, with whom he signed as an underage free agent before the 1978-79 season, after a stellar junior hockey career with the Sherbrooke Castors. He was part of a contingent of young players in the same situation who were nicknamed the "Baby Bulls", a group which also included Michel Goulet, Craig Hartsburg, Keith Crowder, Gaston Gingras and Pat Riggin. Following the NHL-WHA merger at the end of the season, these youngsters were declared to be eligible for the 1979 NHL Entry Draft, making for an exceptionally strong draft class. Vaive was selected fifth overall by the Vancouver Canucks in that draft and his NHL career lasted from 1979 until 1992.

In 1980, the Canucks traded Vaive, along with Bill Derlago, to the Toronto Maple Leafs in exchange for Dave "Tiger" Williams and Jerry Butler. In Toronto, Vaive and Derlago were teamed with Pat Hickey, and Derlago became Vaive's setup man. Vaive scored prolifically with the Leafs, becoming the first 50-goal scorer in franchise history, surpassing that threshold three times. He recorded 54 goals in 1981–82, 51 goals in 1982–83, and 52 goals in 1983–84. Vaive's 54-goal season would stand as a Toronto Maple Leafs franchise record for 40 years before it was surpassed by Auston Matthews in 2021–22. Vaive was a late cut from the 1984 Canada Cup team. He also served as captain of the Maple Leafs from 1982 to 1986. Vaive was stripped of his captaincy during the 1985–86 NHL season, for missing a morning practice.

His trade from the Maple Leafs, along with Steve Thomas and Bob McGill, to the Chicago Blackhawks in exchange for Al Secord and Ed Olczyk before the 1987 season was one of several lamentable trades arranged by team owner Harold Ballard in the 1980s. Vaive netted 43 goals in his first season in Chicago but never managed more than 31 in a season after that. He spent four seasons with the Buffalo Sabres before retiring as a member of the American Hockey League's Hamilton Canucks in 1993.

In May 2000, Vaive was inducted into the PEI Sports Hall of Fame.

Coaching career
Vaive coached in the East Coast Hockey League, American Hockey League and the Ontario Hockey League after his retirement from the NHL, serving as a head coach in 1993 with the expansion South Carolina Stingrays, winning two division titles (1995 and 1997), a conference championship (1997), and in 1996–97 became the first ECHL coach to win both the Brabham Cup and Kelly Cup in the same season. Vaive coached the Mississauga Ice Dogs during the 2000-01 season, guiding the team to the worst record in the league, tying the 1995-96 London Knights for fewest wins in a season. Vaive was fired at the end of the season and replaced by Don Cherry.

Personal
Vaive hosted various shows on Leafs TV, an MLSE-run property focusing on the Toronto Maple Leafs.

Vaive and his wife Joyce have two sons, Jeff and Justin, who was selected by the Anaheim Ducks in the 2007 NHL Entry Draft.

Career statistics

Regular season and playoffs

International

Coaching statistics

Note: G = Games, W = Wins, L = Losses, T = Ties, OTL = Overtime Losses, PCT. = Winning Percentage

References

External links
 
 Profile at hockeydraftcentral.com

1959 births
Living people
Birmingham Bulls players
Buffalo Sabres players
Canadian ice hockey right wingers
Chicago Blackhawks players
Hamilton Canucks players
Sportspeople from Charlottetown
Ice hockey people from Ottawa
Mississauga IceDogs coaches
National Hockey League All-Stars
National Hockey League first-round draft picks
Rochester Americans players
Sherbrooke Castors players
South Carolina Stingrays coaches
Toronto Maple Leafs players
Vancouver Canucks draft picks
Vancouver Canucks players
Ice hockey people from Prince Edward Island
Canadian ice hockey coaches